The 1983 City of Lincoln Council election took place on 5 May 1983. This was on the same day as other local elections. One third of the council was up for election: the seats of the top-polling candidates at the all out election of 1979. The Labour Party retained control of the council.

Overall results

|-
| colspan=2 style="text-align: right; margin-right: 1em" | Total
| style="text-align: right;" | 11
| colspan=5 |
| style="text-align: right;" | 26,984
| style="text-align: right;" |

Ward results

Abbey

Birchwood

Boultham

Note: T. Rook had been elected as a Democratic Labour councillor in 1979

Bracebridge

Carholme

Castle

Longdales

Minster

Moorland

Park

Tritton

References

1983
1983 English local elections
1980s in Lincolnshire